The following is a list of the persons serving in the Vermont Senate during the 2007–2008 session:

Members listed by district

Addison (2 seats)
Claire D. Ayer, Democrat
Harold W. Giard, Democrat

Bennington (2 seats)
Robert Hartwell, Democrat
Richard W. Sears, Democrat

Caledonia (2 seats)
George R. Coppenrath, Republican
M. Jane Kitchel, Democrat

Chittenden (6 seats)
James C. Condos, Democrat
Edward S. Flanagan, Democrat
Virginia V. Lyons, Democrat
Hinda Miller, Democrat
Douglas A. Racine, Democrat
Diane B. Snelling, Republican

Essex-Orleans (2 seats)
Vincent Illuzzi, Republican
Robert A. Starr, Democrat

Franklin (2 seats)
Donald E. Collins, Democrat
Sara Branon Kittell, Democrat

Grand Isle (1 Seat)
Richard T. Mazza, Democrat

Lamoille (1 Seat)
Susan J. Bartlett, Democrat

Orange (1 Seat)
Mark A. MacDonald, Democrat

Rutland (3 seats)
Bill Carris, Democrat
Hull P. Maynard, Jr., Republican
Kevin J. Mullin, Republican

Washington (3 seats)
Ann E. Cummings, Democrat
William T. Doyle, Republican
Phillip B. Scott, Republican

Windham (2 seats)
Peter Shumlin, Democrat
Jeanette K. White, Democrat

Windsor (3 seats)
John F. Campbell, Democrat
Dick McCormack, Democrat
Alice Nitka, Democrat

See also

Vermont Senate Districts, 2002-2012

External links
WCAX-TV's 2006 election results page
Vermont General Election Candidates, 2006 (PDF)

 
Vermont
Vermont Senate